Robert Henry Dewing  (6 August 1863 – 6 November 1934) was an English first-class cricketer and an army officer. Dewing served initially in the Caribbean with the West India Regiment from 1884, before transferring to the British Indian Army around 1895, holding several commands until his retirement in 1912. He came out of retirement to serve in the British Army during the First World War. While in British India, he played first-class cricket for the Europeans cricket team.

Life and military career
Dewing was born in August 1863 at Beyton, Suffolk to the cricketer Edward Dewing. He was educated in Bury St Edmunds at King Edward VI School, before attending Brighton College. From there he attended the Royal Military College, Sandhurst. He graduated from Sandhurst in August 1884, entering as a lieutenant into the West India Regiment. He served with the West India Regiment in Jamaica, Gold Coast, Burma, British India and Singapore. By 1895, he had transferred to the British Indian Army, with promotion to the rank of captain coming in August 1895. He saw action in the Boxer Rebellion, and was promoted to major on 23 August 1902. Dewing was commanding the 76th Punjabis when he was promoted to the rank of lieutenant colonel on 26 October 1908. 

On visits to England between 1905 and 1912, Dewing played minor counties cricket for Suffolk, making eight appearances in the Minor Counties Championship. While in British India, he made a single appearance in first-class cricket for the Europeans against the Parsees at Bombay in the 1907–08 Bombay Triangular. Batting twice in the match, he was dismissed in the Europeans first-innings without scoring by Maneksha Bulsara, while in their second-innings he was dismissed by the same bowler for 3 runs. He retired from the British Indian Army in October 1912.

After returning to England, he served in the British Army during the First World War. He served with the East Yorkshire Regiment, before being seconded to command a training reserve battalion in March 1917. He later served with the Bedfordshire Regiment, where he commanded the 51st Graduate Battalion. He relinquished this command in February 1919. He was made an OBE in the 1919 New Year Honours. Dewing died at Ipswich in November 1934.

References

External links

1863 births
1934 deaths
Military personnel from Suffolk
People from Mid Suffolk District
People educated at King Edward VI School, Bury St Edmunds
People educated at Brighton College
Graduates of the Royal Military College, Sandhurst
West India Regiment officers
British Army personnel of the Boxer Rebellion
English cricketers
Suffolk cricketers
Indian Staff Corps officers
Europeans cricketers
British Army personnel of World War I
East Yorkshire Regiment officers
Bedfordshire and Hertfordshire Regiment officers
Members of the Order of the British Empire